"Every Dog Has Its Day" is a song co-written and recorded by American country music artist Toby Keith. It was released in March 2010 as the third and final single from his 2009 album American Ride. Keith wrote this song with Bobby Pinson and John Waples.

Content
The song is an uptempo tune in which, upon being asked by an intoxicated man to dance, the narrator's lover replies, "Every dog has its day, dog / And today, dog, just ain't yours."

Critical reception
The song has received mixed reviews from music critics. Juli Thanki of Engine 145 said that the song's "infectious hook is offset by an unfortunate stanza they may have been cribbed from Go, Dog. Go!." Matt Bjorke of Roughstock was more positive about the song, describing the song as "a rollicking modern fiddle-filled honky tonker," "playful and irreverent," and "just the kind of up-tempo Toby Keith is able to excel to." Kevin John Coyne of Country Universe gave the song a failing grade, saying that it contains "horrifically cheesy and terribly executed country metaphors."

Chart performance
The song debuted at number 56 on the U.S. Billboard Hot Country Songs charts for the week of October 17, 2009, at the time his single "American Ride" was at Number One for a second week. It later re-entered the charts at number 47 for the week of March 13, 2010, after the single was officially released.

References

2010 singles
2009 songs
Toby Keith songs
Songs written by Toby Keith
Songs written by Bobby Pinson
Show Dog-Universal Music singles
Songs about dogs